is a private university of approximately 3,700 students, in Misasagi-cho, Nara, Japan. It opened in 1969.

It is approximately a 20-minute walk from the Kintetsu train line's Takanohara Station.

References

External links
 Official site (in Japanese)
 Official site (in English)

Private universities and colleges in Japan
Educational institutions established in 1969
Universities and colleges in Nara Prefecture